The Amazônia National Park was created in 1974, as a national park comprising 1,070,737 ha. It is situated in Itaituba and Trairão municipalities, Pará state, in the north region of Brazil. It is located in the watershed of the Tapajós River, about halfway between Manaus and Belém. It is a very biodiverse habitat and contains a wide range of animals and plants.
The specific objectives of the park are the preservation of various Amazonic ecosystems, through scientific, educational and recreational means.

Geography
The park lies on either side of the Tapajós River. The habitat is dense lowland rain forest and there are areas of white-sand grasslands beside the upper reaches of the Tapajós. This river rises in the Precambrian crystalline shields area of ancient igneous rock and carries little sediment. The river acts as a barrier so that some of the animals and plants on one bank are not found on the other.
To the west the park adjoins the  Pau-Rosa National Forest, created in 2001.
The proposed South Amazon Ecological Corridor would link the park to other protected areas and indigenous territories in the region.

History

The Amazônia National Park was created by federal decree 73.683 of 19 February 1974.
Its limits were altered by decree on 18 January 1985.
The management plan was published on 31 December 1988, but was not made official at that time.
The consultative council was created on 26 November 2004.
The limits of the park were altered on 13 February 2006 and again on 12 August 2011.
Law 12678 of 25 June 2012 amended the limits of the Amazônia, Campos Amazônicos and Mapinguari national parks, the Itaituba I, Itaituba II and Crepori national forests and the Tapajós Environmental Protection Area.
All of these were reduced in size except the Campos Amazônicos.

Flora and fauna
Except for about 2% of more open forest, the whole park consists of dense humid tropical forest. Many of the mammals in the park are nocturnal, and some such as the giant otter, Amazonian manatee and giant anteater are endangered. There are also large numbers of reptiles, fish and other aquatic creatures.

Visiting the park
The park can be reached from the city of Itaituba. The Transpantaneira runs from east to west through the park but does not really live up to its name. The road is paved as far as Itaituba but other parts are unpaved earth roads topped with gravel that deteriorate during the rainy season, November to April, and need much repair work each May and June.
The park can be accessed from Santarém, Pará, which is at the confluence of the Tapajós with the Amazon River. Santarém has an airport. Any roads usually require four-wheel-drive vehicles and river transport is normally used in this region.

References

Sources

 

National parks of Brazil
Protected areas of Pará
Protected areas established in 1974
1974 establishments in Brazil